Omphalophana durnalayana is a moth of the family Noctuidae. It is found in Turkey and Iraq.

Adults are on wing in April and from June to August.

External links
Species info

Cuculliinae
Insects of Turkey
Moths described in 1933